Uncial 095 (in the Gregory-Aland numbering), α 1002 (Soden), is a Greek uncial manuscript of the New Testament, dated paleographically to the 8th-century.

Description 
The codex contains a small part of the Acts of the Apostles 2:45-3:8, on one parchment leaf (28 cm by 19 cm). The text is written in one column per page, 21 lines per page, in large uncial letters. 

The manuscript was part of the same codex to which Uncial 0123 belonged. It contains texts of Acts 2:22, 26-28, 45-3:2. 0123 was examined by de Muralt and cited by Tischendorf. Formerly it was classified as lectionary Apostolarion. It was labelled as 72a by Scrivener, as 70a by Gregory.

The Greek text of this codex is mixed. Aland placed it in Category III.

Present location 

Currently it is dated by the INTF to the 8th-century.

Constantin von Tischendorf brought it from Sinai.

The codex 095 is located now in the National Library of Russia (Gr. 17). The codex 0123 has a catalogue number Gr. 49, 1-2, frag. in the same library in Saint Petersburg.

See also 

 List of New Testament uncials
 Textual criticism

References

Further reading 

 Constantin von Tischendorf, Notitia editionis codicis Bibliorum Sinaitici (Leipzig, 1860), p. 50. 
 Eduard de Muralt, Catalogue des manuscrits grecs de la Bibliothèque Impériale publique (Petersburg 1864)
 Kurt Treu, Die Griechischen Handschriften des Neuen Testaments in der UdSSR; eine systematische Auswertung des Texthandschriften in Leningrad, Moskau, Kiev, Odessa, Tbilisi und Erevan, T & U 91 (Berlin, 1966), pp. 35-36.

External links 

 Uncial 095: at the Encyclopedia of Textual Criticism 

Greek New Testament uncials
8th-century biblical manuscripts
National Library of Russia collection